Järveküla may refer to several places in Estonia:

Järveküla, Harju County, village in Rae Parish, Harju County
Järveküla, Saare County, village in Saaremaa Parish, Saare County
Järveküla, Tartu County, village in Elva Parish, Tartu County
Järveküla, Viljandi County, village in Viljandi Parish, Viljandi County

See also
Järvaküla, village in Elva Parish, Tartu County